Bogdan Dobrescu may refer to:

 Mihai Bogdan Dobrescu (born 1976), Romanian boxer
 Bogdan A. Dobrescu, Romanian-born theoretical physicist